Sletterhage Lighthouse is located in Denmark on the southern tip of the Djursland peninsula protruding into the Kattegat between Denmark and Sweden at the entrance to the Baltic Sea. The concrete lighthouse was built in 1894 to help guide ships to and from the Port of Aarhus, via a shipping lane that passes close to the lighthouse isthmus.

After automation the lighthouse keeper buildings were sold to a private owner, but through intervention by Skov- og Naturstyrelsen, the Danish Forest and Nature Agency, they were reacquired for public use. Under an agreement with the local Syddjurs municipality, the lighthouse buildings are open to the public and used for exhibitions. On display are themes related to historical and current navigational equipment and principles, marine life, and the geology of the Sletterhage area. The facilities are open to the public in summer including access to the light house tower.

Before electrification the lighthouse had a clockwork mechanism which had to be wound up every four hours in order to open and close a set of shutters that made the lighthouse flash at specific intervals. Today a 600 watt halogen bulb that turns off and on serves the same function.

The Port of Aarhus built Sletterhage Lighthouse. Today 7000 - 8000 ships pass the lighthouse to and from the seaport, Aarhus, the second largest town in Denmark. Until 1985 SOK, Søværnets Operative Kommando, the Danish Navy Command, had a monitoring station at the lighthouse, where passing ships where identified.

The geological exhibition at the lighthouse gives an understanding of how ice age glaciers formed Mols Bjerge, the Mols Hills, including the peninsula Helgenæs where the lighthouse is located on the southern tip. Characteristic stones from the beach at Sletterhage are on display. The origin of these different stone types can be tracked down to specific prehistoric volcanoes in Norway and Sweden. In this way the stones on the beach can be used to map ice sheet movements during glaciation periods. The life of the small porpoise whales that are often seen from the coast of Sletterhage is also on display.

The hills, coastline, and sea by the lighthouse attracts visitors. Close to the lighthouse is Tyskertårnet, the German Tower, a watch point built during WW2 for surveillance of the Kattegat in occupied Denmark. A hill up from the lighthouse, Ellemandsbjerg, 99 meters above sea level is a view point. From here one can see southern Djursland, the Mols Hills, and the eastern coast of Jutland, plus the islands, Tunø, Samsø and Hjelm, as well as the Ebeltoft-peninsula. On a clear day one can also see Denmark's largest island, Zealand to the south-east. Here Denmark's capital Copenhagen is located. The coast by Sletterhage Lighthouse is visited by anglers and divers. The south facing hills surrounding the lighthouse have a dry microclimate giving living conditions for a number of not often seen insects, including a number of butterfly species.

See also

 List of lighthouses and lightvessels in Denmark

References

External links

 Sletterhage Fyr from fyrtaarne.dk

Lighthouses completed in 1894
Buildings and structures in Syddjurs Municipality
Lighthouses in Denmark
Tourist attractions in Denmark
Tourist attractions in the Central Denmark Region